Johannes "Joey" Martinus Sleegers (born 20 July 1994) is a Dutch professional footballer who plays as a left winger for ADO Den Haag.

Club career
Sleegers is a youth exponent from Feyenoord, a club he joined as a 12-year-old from the RKC Waalwijk youth academy. During the 2014–15 season, he played on loan for FC Eindhoven, where he made his professional team debut on 13 September 2014 against Achilles '29.

On 25 August 2015, Sleegers signed a three-year contract with NEC, who had been promoted to the Eredivisie in the previous season. He made his Eredivisie debut three days later, when NEC beat Willem II 1–0 after a goal from Navarone Foor. Sleegers started the game, but was substituted off for Gregor Breinburg at half-time. On 26 February 2016, Sleegers scored his first goal for NEC in an away game against SC Heerenveen.

During the 2016–17 season, Sleegers was sent on loan to VVV-Venlo. There, he won the Eerste Divisie title and scored eight goals in 35 appearances. After his loan ended, he returned to NEC.

Also in his second period at NEC, Sleegers was unable to secure a place in the starting lineup. Therefore, he moved to Slovakian club AS Trenčín on 5 January 2018, where he signed a multi-year contract. With Trenčín he qualified for the UEFA Europa League with his former club Feyenoord being opponent in the third qualifying round. Sleegers contributed to the elimination of his old club with an assist to the 3–0 in the first leg.

After a stay of one and a half years in Slovakia, Sleegers returned to the Netherlands to sign a three-year contract with FC Eindhoven.

Sleegers joined recently promoted UAE Pro League club Dibba Al Fujairah on 13 July 2022.

On 5 January 2023, Sleegers returned to the Netherlands and signed a 2.5-year contract with ADO Den Haag.

Career statistics

Honours
VVV-Venlo
Eerste Divisie: 2016–17

Individual
Bronzen Stier – Best Player Eerste Divisie: 2014–15
Gouden Stier – Best Talent Eerste Divisie: 2014–15

References

External links

1994 births
Living people
Sportspeople from Helmond
Footballers from North Brabant
Association football wingers
Dutch footballers
Netherlands youth international footballers
RKC Waalwijk players
Feyenoord players
FC Eindhoven players
NEC Nijmegen players
VVV-Venlo players
AS Trenčín players
Dibba FC players
ADO Den Haag players
Eredivisie players
Eerste Divisie players
Slovak Super Liga players
UAE Pro League players
Dutch expatriate footballers
Expatriate footballers in Slovakia
Dutch expatriate sportspeople in Slovakia
Expatriate footballers in the United Arab Emirates
Dutch expatriate sportspeople in the United Arab Emirates